Bala is a rural locality (a selo) and the administrative center of Arylakhsky Rural Okrug of Verkhoyansky District in the Sakha Republic, Russia, located  from Batagay, the administrative center of the district. Its population as of the 2010 Census was 543; down from 579 recorded in the 2002 Census.

References

Notes

Sources
Official website of the Sakha Republic. Registry of the Administrative-Territorial Divisions of the Sakha Republic. Verkhoyansky District. 

Rural localities in Verkhoyansky District